The All-Ireland Senior Hurling Championship 1903 was the 17th series of the All-Ireland Senior Hurling Championship, Ireland's premier hurling knock-out competition.  Cork won the championship, beating London 3-16 to 1-1 in the final.

Format

All-Ireland Championship

Semi-final: (2 matches) The four provincial representatives make up the semi-final pairings.  Two teams are eliminated at this stage while the two winning teams advance to the home final.

Home final: (1 match) The winners of the two semi-finals contest this game.  One team is eliminated while the winning team advances to the final.

Final: (1 match) The winners of the home final and London, who receive a bye to this stage of the championship, contest this game.  The winners are declared All-Ireland champions.

Results

Connacht Senior Hurling Championship

Leinster Senior Hurling Championship

Kilkenny made an objection against the Dublin goal, and were awarded the title without the need for a replay.

Munster Senior Hurling Championship

Ulster Senior Hurling Championship

All-Ireland Senior Hurling Championship

Championship statistics

Miscellaneous

 Cork win their 6th All-Ireland title to draw level with Tipperary at the top of the all-time roll of honour.

References

Sources

 Corry, Eoghan, The GAA Book of Lists (Hodder Headline Ireland, 2005).
 Donegan, Des, The Complete Handbook of Gaelic Games (DBA Publications Limited, 2005).

1903
All-Ireland Senior Hurling Championship